Banksia longicarpa is an extinct species of tree or shrub, known from fossil Banksia "cones" recovered from rocks at Poole Creek and Woomera in northern South Australia. Its elongate woody axis with prominent follicles resemble the fruiting cone of the living species Banksia serrata.

References

longicarpa
Prehistoric angiosperms
Extinct flora of Australia
Miocene plants
Plants described in 2001